James "Jim" Beach (born October 28, 1946) is an American Democratic Party politician who has served in the New Jersey Senate since 2009, where he represents the 6th legislative district. He has been the Assistant Majority Leader in the Senate since 2016.

Early life 
Beach has earned a B.S. degree in psychology from Midwestern College and a M.A. degree in personnel services from Rowan University. A resident of Voorhees Township, Beach first entered Camden County politics after responding to a 1990 recruitment ad that county Democrats had posted seeking prospective candidates to burnish the party's image and help retain the Democrats' control of county government. Beach showed up at his interview with his tax bill complaining about his taxes, and was described by Freeholder Jeffrey L. Nash as just what the party was seeking in a candidate, "regular people complaining about their taxes". He was elected to the Camden County Board of Chosen Freeholders in 1991, and was named as freeholder director in 1993. Beach was elected as Camden County Clerk in 1995.

New Jersey Senate 
He served as county clerk until 2009 until he was appointed to the Senate seat formerly held by John Adler, who had won a seat in the United States House of Representatives. With the endorsement of George Norcross, Beach ran unopposed in the convention. Beach won a November 2009 special election in order to remain in the Senate through the end of Adler's four-year term. Beach saw his salary drop from $153,437 annually as county clerk to $49,000 as state senator, and indicated after his selection to fill the Senate seat that he would seek additional employment to supplement his salary, ensuring that there was no conflict with his position as senator. Beach was soon hired by Camden County College for a part-time job as an advisor, allowing him to collect an annual salary of $10,400 and remain in New Jersey's Public Employee Retirement System, for which county clerks but not state senators are eligible. After critical editorials in The Star-Ledger and the Courier-Post accused Beach of abusing the public pension system, Beach left the Camden County College job. He has served as Assistant Majority Leader since 2014.

Committees 
Committee assignments for the current session are:
State Government, Wagering, Tourism & Historic Preservation, Chair
Higher Education, Vice-Chair
Joint Committee on the Public Schools

District 6 
Each of the 40 districts in the New Jersey Legislature has one representative in the New Jersey Senate and two members in the New Jersey General Assembly. Each of the 40 districts in the New Jersey Legislature has one representative in the New Jersey Senate and two members in the New Jersey General Assembly. Representatives from the 6th District for the 2022—2023 Legislative Session are:
Senator James Beach (D) 
Assemblyman Louis Greenwald (D) 
Assemblywoman Pamela Rosen Lampitt (D)

Personal life 
Beach had worked as an educator and football coach at schools including both St. Joseph's High School and Woodrow Wilson High School in Camden and Highland Regional High School in Blackwood, and had been  director of vocational education at the Black Horse Pike Regional School District.

Election history

Senate

References

External links
Senator Beach's legislative web page, New Jersey Legislature
New Jersey Legislature financial disclosure forms
2010 2009 2008 
Project Vote Smart - James Beach profile

1946 births
Living people
Midwestern College alumni
County commissioners in New Jersey
Democratic Party members of the New Jersey General Assembly
Democratic Party New Jersey state senators
County clerks in New Jersey
People from Voorhees Township, New Jersey
Politicians from Camden County, New Jersey
Rowan University alumni
21st-century American politicians